George Steel (June 3, 1858–August 20, 1940) was a politician in Manitoba, Canada.  He served in the Legislative Assembly of Manitoba from 1899 to 1915.

Steel was born in Ayrshire, Scotland, the son of John Steel, and was educated at public schools in Lorne and Dallegles.  He worked as a farmer, and resided in Glenboro, Manitoba.  In religion, Steel was a Presbyterian.

He was first elected to the Manitoba legislature in the 1899 provincial election, defeating Liberal incumbent Alfred Doig by 98 votes in the constituency of Cypress. He identified himself as a "Liberal-Conservative", and sat as a backbench supporter the Conservative administrations led by Hugh John Macdonald and Rodmond Roblin.

Steel was re-elected in the 1903 election as a Liberal-Conservative, and in the elections of 1907, 1910 and 1914 as a Conservative.  He continued to serve as a backbench supporter of Roblin's administration throughout this period.

In 1915, the Roblin government was forced to resign amid a serious corruption scandal.  A new election was called, which the Liberals won in a landslide.  Steel lost his constituency seat to Liberal Andrew Myles by sixty-two votes.

He died in Glenboro at the age of 82.

References 

1858 births
Progressive Conservative Party of Manitoba MLAs
1940 deaths